A requirement diagram is a diagram specially used in SysML in which requirements and the relations between them and their relationship to other model elements are shown as discussed in the following paragraphs.

Derive requirement relationship 

If a requirement is derived from another requirement, their relation is named "derive requirement relationship".

Namespace containment 

If a requirement is contained in another requirement, their relation is named "namespace containment".

Satisfy relationship 

If a requirement is satisfied by a design element, their relation is named "satisfy relationship".

Copy relationship 

If a requirement is a copy of another requirement, their relation is named "copy relationship".

Verify relationship 

If there exists a relation between a requirement and a test case verifying this requirement, their relation is named "verify relationship".

Test case 

A test case is defined by a flow checking whether the system under consideration satisfies a requirement.

Refine relationship 

If a requirement is refined by other requirements / model elements, the relation is named "refine relationship".

Trace relationship 

If there exists a relation between a requirement and an arbitrary model element traced by this requirement, their relation is named "trace relationship".

References 

Systems Modeling Language
Software requirements
Systems engineering